Brigadier Farzand-i-Dilband Rasikh-al-Iqtidad-i-Daulat-i-Inglishia, Raja-i-Rajagan, Maharaja Sukhjit Singh Sahib Bahadur, Crown Prince of Kapurthala, MVC (born 15 October 1934) is a former Indian Army officer who served with The Scinde Horse. He was awarded the Maha Vir Chakra, India's second highest award for gallantry, for his leadership and courage in facing the enemy during the Battle of Basantar in the Indo-Pakistani War of 1971.

Early life
Crown Prince Sukhjit Singh was born on 15 October 1934, in Bangalore as the second child to the Crown Prince Paramjit Singh (son of King Jagatjit Singh I) by his second wife, Lilavati Devi, he had an elder sister, Princess Aas Kaur (b.1933 - d.2017) as well as three paternal elder half-sisters (Princess Indira Devi, Princess Sushila Devi and Princess Urmila Devi) from, Brinda Devi, the first wife of his father.

He was educated at The Doon School in Dehradun, and then received military training at the Indian Military Academy.

His fondest memory is of rides with his grandfather, the Maharaja of Kapurthala, "in a zebra-driven chariot in the zoological gardens of the palace", according to an interview to The Tribune.

Military career
During the Indo-Pakistani War of 1971, Brigadier Sukhjit Singh held the rank of Lt. Colonel. In the Battle of Basantar, Lt. Col. Sukhjit Singh was in command of The Scinde Horse (14 Horse) armored regiment, which was deployed in Shakargarh. On the night of 8 December, the regiment crossed into Pakistani territory and established itself near Nainan Kot. On 10 December, Pakistani forces launched a powerful armored counterattack which Lt. Col. Sukhjit Singh's regiment successfully resisted. Leading from the front, Lt. Col. Sukhjit Singh directed his tanks with great skill. His unit forced the Pakistani force to retreat after the loss of only one tank. The next day, under heavy artillery and mortar fire, Lt. Col. Sukhjit Singh led an operation to capture enemy tanks at Malakpur. In the ensuing engagement, his regiment destroyed eight Pakistani tanks and captured one officer, two junior commissioned officers and two other soldiers.

Lt. Col. Sukhjit Singh later received the Maha Vir Chakra, India's second highest award for gallantry in the face of the enemy, in recognition of his efforts in the Battle of Basantar. Lt. Col. Sukhjit Singh eventually rose to the rank of Brigadier.

References

1934 births
Living people
Recipients of the Maha Vir Chakra
Indian Army officers
Indian Sikhs
The Doon School alumni
Indian Military Academy alumni
Maharajas of Kapurthala